Eridon Qardaku (born 10 August 2000) is an Albanian professional footballer who plays as an attacking midfielder for Albanian club Bylis.

Career statistics

Club

References

External links
Eridon Qardaku at the Albanian Football Association

2000 births
Living people
People from Shkodër County
Sportspeople from Shkodër
Footballers from Shkodër
Albanian footballers
Association football midfielders
KF Bylis Ballsh players
Kategoria Superiore players